, also known as Gorō, Yoshiari, Michinobu and Yoshitoshi, was a Japanese samurai leader in the Sengoku period. He was the tenth head of the Isshiki clan. He was the son of Isshiki Yoshimichi. His father committed seppuku when Yada  castle was attacked by Hosokawa Fujitaka. Yoshisada escaped to Yuminoki castle.

References

Daimyo
1582 deaths
Year of birth unknown